Strophomena is a genus of brachiopods belonging to the order Strophomenida family Strophomenidae, named by Rafinesque in 1824. They were stationary epifaunal suspension feeders.

These brachiopods (often known as lamp shells) lived from the Ordovician period to the Devonian period.

Distribution

Devonian of Italy, Silurian to Devonian of Algeria, Morocco; Silurian of Australia, Morocco, Russia, Sweden, United States; Ordovician of Australia, Canada, China, France, Ireland, Kazakhstan, Norway, Portugal, Russia, Spain, Sweden, the United Kingdom, United States; Llandeilo of China; Whiterockian of United States; Dawan of China; Arenig of China.

Species
Strophomena amoena
Strophomena billingsi
Strophomena concordensis
Strophomena costellata
Strophomena dignata
Strophomena extensa
Strophomena euglypha
Strophomena filitexta
Strophomena fluctuosa
Strophomena hecuba
Strophomena hirundo
Strophomena incurvata
Strophomena lenta
Strophomena minuta
Strophomena nutans
Strophomena orthonurensis
Strophomena perconcava
Strophomena planumbona
Strophomena plattinensis
Strophomena rhomboidalis
Strophomena striatissima
Strophomena vetusta

See also 
 List of brachiopod genera

References 

 Organism names
 Paleobiology Database
 Sepkoski, Jack Sepkoski's Online Genus Database
 Encyclopædia Britannica
 Strophomena

Strophomenida
Prehistoric brachiopod genera
Ordovician genus first appearances
Silurian genera
Devonian genus extinctions
Ordovician brachiopods
Silurian brachiopods
Devonian brachiopods
Fossils of Georgia (U.S. state)
Paleozoic life of Ontario
Paleozoic life of Alberta
Paleozoic life of British Columbia
Paleozoic life of Manitoba
Paleozoic life of the Northwest Territories
Paleozoic life of Nunavut
Paleozoic life of Quebec